The Paisley Gilmour Street rail accident occurred on 16 April 1979 at 19:50. The 19:40 Inverclyde Line service from Glasgow Central to Wemyss Bay, operated by two Class 303 trains, crossed from the Down Fast Line to the Down Gourock Line under clear signals at Wallneuk Junction immediately to the east of Paisley Gilmour Street railway station. It collided head-on with the 18:58 Ayrshire Coast Line special service from Ayr to Glasgow Central, formed of two Class 126 diesel multiple units, which had left Platform 2 against a red signal P31.

Factors
The DMU had started away from the platform against a red signal. A type of SASSPAD (starting against signal at danger) accident, also colloquially known as ding-ding, and away. This accident prompted British Rail to change the Rules so that the bell or "Right Away" signal is only given when the Starting signal has been cleared. 

Both drivers and five passengers were killed. 67 passengers and the guard of the Class 303 were injured and were taken to hospital. Only three of these remained in hospital.

Aftermath
Immediately after the accident the power was turned off on the Inverclyde Line; and a bus service substituted between Paisley St James and Paisley Gilmour Street station. Some trains were trapped west of Paisley St James, after a few hours a limited train service ran between Paisley St James and Gourock. The Wemyss Bay line was closed.

The Ayrshire Coast services were diverted onto the Paisley Canal Line, which at that time was running services from Glasgow Central station to Kilmacolm, rejoining the Ayrshire Coast Line at Elderslie junction.

Both lines were handed back for normal operations at 23:00 on 17 April.

See also
 Glasgow Bellgrove rail crash
 Newton (South Lanarkshire) rail accident

References

Notes

Sources

 Hall, Stanley (1999). Hidden Dangers: Railway Safety in the Era of Privatisation. Shepperton: Ian Allan. .

External links
Official accident report courtesy of the Railways Archive

Train collisions in Scotland
Railway accidents in 1979
Transport in Paisley, Renfrewshire
1979 in Scotland
History of Renfrewshire
Railway accidents involving a signal passed at danger
Accidents and incidents involving British Rail
1979 disasters in the United Kingdom
April 1979 events in the United Kingdom
Rail accidents caused by a driver's error